Netechma altobrasiliana is a species of moth of the family Tortricidae. It is found in Brazil's Federal District.

References

Moths described in 2001
Netechma